The 1972 Montana gubernatorial election took place on November 7, 1972. Incumbent Governor of Montana Forrest H. Anderson, who was first elected in 1968, declined to seek re-election. Thomas Lee Judge, the Lieutenant Governor of Montana, won a competitive Democratic primary, and moved on to the general election, where he faced Ed Smith, a rancher and the Republican nominee. Although then-President Richard Nixon won the state in a landslide in that year's presidential election, Judge managed to handily defeat Smith, winning his first of two terms as governor.

Democratic primary

Candidates
Thomas Lee Judge, Lieutenant Governor of Montana
Dick Dzivi, Majority Leader of the Montana Senate
Eva Levengood Shunkwiler
Dallas E. Howard
David E. Burnham

Results

Republican primary

Candidates
Ed Smith, rancher
Frank Dunkle, former Director of the Montana Department of Fish, Wildlife and Parks, former State Senator
Tom A. Selstad, businessman
Warren McMillan

Results

General election

Results

References

Montana
Gubernatorial
1972